Rafik Zekhnini (born 12 January 1998) is a Norwegian professional footballer who plays as a forward for Eliteserien club Molde.

Career
Zekhnini started his career at Herøya IL, before joining the youth academy of Odds BK in 2013. He signed a professional contract with the club 12 January 2015, and made his debut in a cup match in April the same year. He made his league debut 12 July, against Rosenborg, and scored his first goal, two weeks later, in extra time against Tromsø. Zekhnini had his big breakthrough during the play-off matches in the Europa League qualification against Borussia Dortmund in August 2015. He got an assist after just 16 seconds in the first play-off match at Skagerak Arena. After those matches, he received a lot of attention from several big clubs, including Borussia Dortmund and Manchester United.

On 16 July 2017, Zekhnini signed a five-year contract with the Serie A club Fiorentina for a reported fee of €1.5 million. On 4 April 2018, he returned to Norway to join Rosenborg on loan until the end of the Serie A season.

On 29 August 2018, Zekhnini was loaned to the Dutch second tier team Twente on a season-long loan. Zekhnini did a good performance during his one year loan playing in the Dutch second tier league. Twente won the league and was promoted to play in the Eredivisie in the 2019-20 season. In July 2019, Twente announced that Zekhnini would spend another year on loan from Fiorentina.

Personal life
Zekhnini is of Moroccan descent.

Career statistics

Honours
Molde
 Eliteserien: 2022
 Norwegian Cup: 2021–22

References

External links
 
 

1998 births
Living people
Sportspeople from Skien
Association football wingers
Norwegian footballers
Norway under-21 international footballers
Norway youth international footballers
Odds BK players
ACF Fiorentina players
Rosenborg BK players
FC Twente players
FC Lausanne-Sport players
Molde FK players
Eliteserien players
Serie A players
Eerste Divisie players
Eredivisie players
Swiss Super League players
Norwegian expatriate footballers
Norwegian expatriate sportspeople in Italy
Expatriate footballers in Italy
Norwegian expatriate sportspeople in the Netherlands
Expatriate footballers in the Netherlands
Norwegian expatriate sportspeople in Switzerland
Expatriate footballers in Switzerland
Norwegian people of Moroccan descent